Sewdatt Shivnarine (born May 13, 1952) is a West Indian former cricketer who played in eight Tests and one ODI from 1978 to 1979. He emigrated to the United States, represented their national cricket team.

References

External links 
 Cricinfo player profile

1952 births
Living people
West Indies Test cricketers
West Indies One Day International cricketers
Guyanese emigrants to the United States
Guyanese cricketers
Berbice cricketers
Indo-Guyanese people
Guyana cricketers
American cricketers
American cricket captains